Helene Michelson (born 8 December 1906, date of death unknown) was an Estonian figure skater. She competed in the pairs event at the 1936 Winter Olympics.

Helene Michelson and Karin Peckert-Forsman were the first Estonian females at the Winter Olympics. Alpine skier Peckert-Forsman competed first and is therefor counted as the first female competitors at the Olympics from Estonia.

References

External links
 

1906 births
Year of death missing
Estonian female pair skaters
Olympic figure skaters of Estonia
Figure skaters at the 1936 Winter Olympics
Figure skaters from Tallinn